Miniaturization (Br.Eng.: Miniaturisation) is the trend to manufacture ever smaller mechanical, optical and electronic products and devices. Examples include miniaturization of mobile phones, computers and vehicle engine downsizing. In electronics, the exponential scaling and miniaturization of silicon MOSFETs (MOS transistors) leads to the number of transistors on an integrated circuit chip doubling every two years, an observation known as Moore's law. This leads to MOS integrated circuits such as microprocessors and memory chips being built with increasing transistor density, faster performance, and lower power consumption, enabling the miniaturization of electronic devices.

History 

The history of miniaturization is associated with the history of information technology based on the succession of switching devices, each smaller, faster, cheaper than its predecessor. During the period referred to as the Second Industrial Revolution, miniaturization was confined to two-dimensional electronic circuits used for the manipulation of information. This orientation is demonstrated in the use of vacuum tubes in the first general-purpose computers. The technology gave way to the development of transistors in the 1950s and then the integrated circuit (IC) approach developed afterward.

The MOSFET (metal–oxide–semiconductor field-effect transistor, or MOS transistor) was invented by Mohamed M. Atalla and Dawon Kahng at Bell Labs in 1959, and demonstrated in 1960. It was the first truly compact transistor that could be miniaturized and mass-produced for a wide range of uses, due to its high scalability and low power consumption, leading to increasing transistor density. This made it possible to build high-density IC chips, enabling what would later be known as Moore's law.

In the early 1960s, Gordon E. Moore, who later founded Intel, recognized that the ideal electrical and scaling characteristics of MOSFET devices would lead to rapidly increasing integration levels and unparalleled growth in electronic applications. Moore's law, which was described by Gordon Moore in 1965 and later named after him, predicted that the number of transistors on an integrated circuit for minimum component cost doubles every 18 months.

In 1974, Robert H. Dennard at IBM recognized the rapid MOSFET scaling technology and formulated the related Dennard scaling rule. MOSFET scaling and miniaturization has since been the key driving force behind Moore's law. This enables integrated circuits such as microprocessors and memory chips to be built in smaller sizes and with greater transistor density.    

Moore described the development of miniaturization in 1975 during the International Electron Devices Meeting, where he confirmed his earlier prediction that silicon integrated circuit would dominate electronics, underscoring that during the period such circuits were already high-performance devices and starting to become cheaper. This was made possible by a reliable manufacturing process, which involved the fabrication in a batch process. It employed photolithographic, mechanical, and chemical processing steps to create multiple transistors on a single wafer of silicon. The measure of this process was its yield, which is the ratio of working devices to those with defects and, given a satisfactory yield, a smaller transistor means that more can be on a single wafer, making each one cheaper to produce.

Development 
Miniaturization became a trend in the last fifty years and came to cover not just electronic but also mechanical devices. By 2004, electronic companies were producing silicon integrated circuit chips with switching MOS transistors that had feature size as small as 130 nanometers (nm) and development was also underway for chips that are merely few nanometers in size through the nanotechnology initiative. The focus is to make components smaller to increase the number that can be integrated into a single wafer and this required critical innovations, which include increasing wafer size, the development of sophisticated metal connections between the chip's circuits, and improvement in the polymers used for masks (photoresists) in the photolithography processes. These last two are the areas where miniaturization has moved into the nanometer range.  

Miniaturization in electronics is advancing rapidly due to the comparative ease in miniaturizing electrical devices. The process for mechanical devices, on the other hand, is more complex due to the way the structural properties of its parts change as they shrink. It is said that the so-called Third Industrial Revolution is based on economically viable technologies that can shrink three-dimensional objects.

See also
Miniature helicopter
Nanotechnology

References

External links
 Miniaturization - Glossary definition

Industrial processes
Technological change